Garrido is a Spanish surname, meaning "elegant". Notable people with the surname include:

 Adriano Garrido (born 1972), Brazilian beach volleyball player
 Alberto Garrido (1949–2007), Argentine-Venezuelan journalist
 Antonio Garrido (actor) (born 1971), Spanish actor and TV presenter
 Antonio Garrido (golfer) (born 1944), Spanish golfer
 António Garrido (referee) (born 1932), Portuguese football referee
 Augie Garrido (born 1939), baseball coach
 Carlos Garrido (footballer, born 1977), Chilean footballer
 Carlos Rafael Uribazo Garrido (born 1951), Cuban artist
 Carlota Garrido de la Peña (1870–1958), Argentine journalist, writer, teacher
 David Garrido, journalist and sports presenter
 Fanny Garrido (1846–1917), Spanish writer
 Francisco Garrido Peña (born 1958), Spanish politician
 Germán Garrido (born 1948), Spanish golfer
 Hector Garrido, pulp fiction cover illustrator
 Ignacio Garrido (born 1972), Spanish golfer
 Javier Garrido, (born 1985), Spanish football player
 José Antonio Garrido (born 1975), Spanish road bicycle racer
 José María Rojas Garrido (1824–1883), Colombian politician
 Juan Garrido, conquistador
 Juan Carlos Garrido (born 1969), Spanish football manager
 Leandro Ramón Garrido (1868–1909), Spanish-English painter based in France
 Lizardo Garrido (born 1957), Chilean footballer
 Lucas Lara Garrido (1966–2006), Spanish astrophysicist
 Luis de Garrido (born 1960), Spanish architect
 Luis Garrido, Honduran football player
 Luis Javier Garrido (1941–2012), Mexican political analyst
 Manuel Rivera Garrido (born 1978), Peruvian football player
 Marissa Garrido (1926–2021), Mexican telenovela playwright and writer
 Miguel Ángel Garrido Gallardo (born 1945), university professor of literary theory
 Nancy Garrido (born 1955), American nursing aide and wife of Phillip
 Norberto Garrido (born 1972), American football player
 Pablo Garrido (born 1938), Mexican athlete
 Phillip Garrido (born 1951), sex offender who along with his wife, Nancy, kidnapped 11‑year-old Jaycee Lee Dugard and held her captive for 18 years.
 Raúl Hernández Garrido (born 1964), Spanish playwright
 Reynaldo Garrido (born 1934), Cuban tennis player

Other uses 
 Garrido (grape), a Spanish wine grape

Spanish-language surnames